Show-Biz Blues: Fleetwood Mac 1968 to 1970 is an album by British blues rock band Fleetwood Mac, released in 2001. It was a compilation of outtakes and unreleased tracks from the band's early line-up, none of which had previously seen the light of day officially. Available on double vinyl LP and double CD, it came with a booklet of extensive notes and anecdotes, and was the companion release to The Vaudeville Years of Fleetwood Mac 1968–1970.

Track listing

Tracks 1–3 are not performed by Fleetwood Mac, but by Peter B's Looners (credits below).

Track 8 is listed as "My Baby's Sweeter" (not by Sonny Boy Williamson but a Willie Dixon composition performed by Little Walter) but it actually is the Homesick James song "My Baby's Sweet", which they often played at concerts.

 Disc 2 consists of live recordings.

Credits

Peter B's Looners (1-1 to 1–3) 
Peter Bardens – keyboards
Peter Green – guitar
David Ambrose – bass guitar
Mick Fleetwood – drums, percussion

Fleetwood Mac (remainder) 
Peter Green – guitar, vocals
Jeremy Spencer – guitar, vocals
Danny Kirwan – guitar, vocals (1–11 to end)
John McVie – bass guitar
Mick Fleetwood – drums, percussion

References

Fleetwood Mac compilation albums
2001 compilation albums